The 2006 African Judo Championships were the 27th edition of the African Judo Championships, and were held in Port-Louis, Mauritius from  29 May 2006 to 6 June 2006.

References

External links
 

African Judo Championships
African Championships
Sports competitions in Mauritius
Judo competitions in Mauritius
May 2006 sports events in Africa
June 2006 sports events in Africa